Trematocephalus simplex, is a species of spider of the genus Trematocephalus. It is endemic to Sri Lanka.

See also
 List of Linyphiidae species

References

Linyphiidae
Spiders of Asia
Spiders described in 1894